Susanne Cleans Up (German: Susanne macht Ordnung) is a 1930 musical comedy film directed by Eugen Thiele and starring Truus Van Aalten, Francis Lederer and Albert Paulig. The film's sets were designed by the art director Willi Herrmann.

Synopsis
Susanne Braun is keen to meet her father who she has never seen, but who supports her financially. She visits the Berlin lawyer who oversees the monthly maintenance payments, but he sets her on completely the wrong track. Consequently she encounters several potential fathers.

Cast
 Truus Van Aalten as Susanne Braun
 Francis Lederer as 	Robert 
 Mary Parker as Dolores
 Albert Paulig as Voeller, Firmeninhaber
 Martin Kettner as 	Bing, Firmeninhaber
 Max Ehrlich as 	Wasservogel, Prokurist
 S.Z. Sakall as Dr. Fuchs, juristischer Berater
 Maria Hofen as Frau von Dr. Fuchs
 Kurt Lilien as 	Klingenberg, Freund Dr. Fuchs'
 Senta Söneland as Frau Klingenberg
 Lotte Stein as Frau Bing
 Maria Forescu as Frl. Laron, Pensionats-Vorsteherin
 Irma Godau as Tänzerin Georgette

References

Bibliography 
 Bock, Hans-Michael & Bergfelder, Tim. The Concise Cinegraph: Encyclopaedia of German Cinema. Berghahn Books, 2009.

External links 
 

1930 films
1930 comedy films
Films of the Weimar Republic
German comedy films
1930s German-language films
Films directed by Eugen Thiele
German black-and-white films
1930s German films